"The Walrus and the Carpenter" is a narrative poem by Lewis Carroll that appears in his book Through the Looking-Glass, published in December 1871. The poem is recited in chapter four, by Tweedledum and Tweedledee to Alice. The poem is composed of 18 stanzas and contains 108 lines, in an alternation of iambic tetrameters and iambic trimeters. The rhyme scheme is ABCBDB, with masculine rhymes throughout. The rhyming and rhythmical scheme used, as well as some archaisms and syntactical turns, are those of the traditional English ballad.

Summary

The Walrus and the Carpenter are the eponymous characters in the poem, which Tweedledum and Tweedledee recite to Alice. Walking upon a beach one night when both sun and moon are visible, the Walrus and Carpenter come upon an offshore bed of oysters. Groups of four are called up; the exact number is unknown. To the disapproval of the eldest oyster, many more follow them. After walking along the beach (a point is made of the fact that the oysters are all neatly shod despite having no feet), they rest on a low rock. After bringing bread, pepper, and vinegar the Walrus and the Carpenter are revealed to be predatory and eat all of the oysters. The Walrus expresses some compunction towards the oysters but eats them anyway, while the Carpenter dispassionately asks for more bread and complains that the butter is spread too thickly. After hearing the poem, the good-natured Alice attempts to determine which of the two leading characters might be the more sympathetic, but is thwarted by the twins' further interpretation:

Interpretations

The characters of the Walrus and the Carpenter have been interpreted many ways both in literary criticism and popular culture. Some, including the character Loki in the film Dogma, interpret the Walrus to be a caricature of the Buddha and the Carpenter to be a caricature of Jesus Christ. British essayist J. B. Priestley argued that the figures were political, as does Walter Russell Mead, who utilises the Walrus and the Carpenter as an allegory for the United Kingdom and the United States respectively.

However, in The Annotated Alice, Martin Gardner notes that, when Carroll gave the manuscript for Looking Glass to illustrator John Tenniel, he gave him the choice of drawing a carpenter, a butterfly, or a baronet, since each word would fit the poem's metre. Because Tenniel rather than Carroll chose the carpenter, the character's significance in the poem is probably not in his profession, and interpretations of the poem as a commentary on religion are likely false. Gardner cautions the reader that there is not always intended symbolism in the Alice books, which were made for the imagination of children and not the analysis of "mad people".

In popular culture

Television
 In the Danger Man episode "The Black Book", John Drake (Patrick McGoohan) uses "The time has come," the walrus said, "to talk of many things: Of shoes and ships - and sealing wax - of cabbages and kings" as an introduction to a femme fatale.
 In The Wild Wild West episode "The Night of the Underground Terror", James West briefly quotes from the poem when he first meets the episode's villain.
 In a 1976 episode of The Bionic Woman titled "Black Magic", the poem was used as a clue to find treasure.
 In the episode "I'm a Poet" from the first season of Arthur, Arthur Read and Buster Baxter read poems at the library. Buster reads lines from "The Walrus and the Carpenter" and finds it confusing.
 In the Doctor Who episode, "The Rings of Akhaten", the Doctor mentions "Shoes and ships and sealing-wax and cabbages and kings", when talking about things made by the stars.

Films
 The quote "'The time has come,' the walrus said" is used as code between Irene Dunne and Clive Brook in the 1933 film If I Were Free.
 In the 1934 Betty Boop short film Betty in Blunderland, the Carpenter is using a hammer on a saw with two lobsters and three clams and the Walrus is on a board eating fishes out of a fishbowl.
 Groucho Marx briefly quotes the poem in the film Animal Crackers.
 "The Walrus and the Carpenter" song is sung by Tweedledum and Tweedledee in Walt Disney's 1951 film Alice in Wonderland with the Moon and the Sun on each side and the oysters. The Walrus is portrayed as an intelligent, but lazy conman, with the Carpenter as a hardworking, but dimwitted sidekick who needs beating with a cane for acting before thinking. All characters in the story are voiced by J. Pat O'Malley. After the Carpenter discovers a family of oysters underwater, the Walrus tries to persuade them to come "walk" with them. The Mother Oyster, on the other hand, knows that the oysters will be eaten, and attempts to stop her children from following the Walrus. However, the Walrus, refusing to take no for an answer, stops her by knocking her out with his cane and leads the dozen curious, younger oysters in a Pied Piper-like dance and flute solo ashore, where the Carpenter builds a restaurant from a shipwreck on the beach in seconds. Once everyone is inside, the Walrus tricks the Carpenter into preparing some food so that he can eat all the oysters himself (off screen). When the Carpenter returns to find every last oyster devoured and that the Walrus has tricked him, his face turns red with anger and he chases the Walrus outside with his hammer. Near the end of the film, the Walrus and the Carpenter, along with the oysters are part of the caucus race, later the Walrus and the Carpenter among those who join the Queen of Hearts in chasing Alice by the queen's orders to behead Alice.
 The Jack Warden character "Doc" in the 1963 John Wayne and Lee Marvin film Donovan's Reef, quotes part of the poem to his visiting daughter from Boston, who looks down her society nose at the lifestyles of the people who live on the island.
 Harriet the Spy, a 1996 adaptation of the Louise Fitzhugh novel, shows lead character Harriet and her nanny (played by Rosie O'Donnell) reciting alternating lines of the poem to each other on multiple occasions.
 In the 1999 film Dogma, the Matt Damon character Loki tells a nun this story as his reason for becoming atheist. 
 In the 2014 horror-comedy film Tusk, Howard Howe says "The sun was shining on the sea, shining with all his might. He did his very best to make the billows warm and bright. And this was odd because it was the middle of the night!" to Wallace Bryton.
 In the 1985 film The Breakfast Club, Brian Johnson, played by Anthony Michael Hall, sits after being assigned an essay muttering to himself “Who do I think I am? Who are you? Who are you? … I am the walrus…” He is of course referencing the Beatles song, “I am the Walrus” however, this song is a reference to the poem.

Music
 In the Beatles 1967 song "I Am the Walrus", the title character refers to the Carroll poem. John Lennon later expressed chagrin upon belatedly realising that the walrus was a villain in the poem. Lennon joked in retrospect, perhaps he should have titled the song, "I Am The Carpenter."
 Some verses of the poem are referenced in the song "Just One Lifetime", by Sting and Shaggy, included in their collaborative album 44/876.
 Scottish singer and songwriter Donovan put the poem to music on his 1971 album, HMS Donovan.
 The song "That's What Living is to Me" by Jimmy Buffett (on the 1988 album Hot Water) includes the line "The time has come, the walrus said/and little oysters hide their head."

Literature
 A line from the poem was used by O. Henry for the title of his 1904 book Cabbages and Kings.
 In Upton Sinclair's novel Oil!, speculators offer J. Arnold Ross opportunities to improve his wealth through wartime investments in "shoes, or ships, or sealing wax".
 In Ayn Rand's 1943 novel The Fountainhead, the book's main villain — scheming architecture critic and socialist activist Ellsworth Toohey — launches a vicious campaign against the protagonist, unconventional architect Howard Roark. Toohey prefaces his article with a paraphrase of Carrol: "The time has come," the Walrus said/ "To talk of many things:/ Of ships—and shoes—and Howard Roark/ And cabbages—and kings/ And why the sea is boiling hot—/ And whether Roark has wings." 
 Lines were used as clues in the Ellery Queen mystery story "The Adventure of the Mad Tea-Party".
 In The Clocks by Agatha Christie (1963), Hercule Poirot quotes part of the poem to his visiting mentee, Colin Lamb, who is trying to find the importance of clocks found at a murder scene.
 The Lucy Maud Montgomery character Anne quotes the part of this poem when talking about things she might learn in college in the book Anne of the Island.
 A line from the poem was used as the title of the 1965 book Why The Sea Is Boiling Hot: A Symposium On The Church And The World. It was a collection of essays by a group of leading literary and political writers concerning the place of the church in 1960s Canadian society, commissioned by the then-Board of Evangelism and Social Service of the United Church of Canada.
 The surreal short story "The Sea was Wet as Wet Could Be" by Gahan Wilson, first published in Playboy in 1967, was inspired by the poem and includes large portions of it.
 In the Kinnikuman manga series, the villainous wrestler and superman Neptuneman tells the tale to the good-natured Seiuchin (a walrus-themed hero and wrestler), driving him to embrace his own predatory nature and start displaying an egotistical streak.
 The sentence is used as a final quote in the book Dreams from Bunker Hill of John Fante, Black Sparrow Press, 1982.
 In Arthur C. Clarke's 1982 novel 2010: Odyssey Two, the poem is playfully quoted as "'The time has come,' said Dr. Dimitri Moisevitch to his old friend Heywood Floyd, 'to talk of many things. Of shoes and spaceships and sealing wax, but mostly of monoliths and malfunctioning computers.'" in reference to the events from 2001: A Space Odyssey.
 In Sandra Cisneros's 1997 novel The House on Mango Street, Esperanza recites the poem to Ruthie in the vignette "Edna's Ruthie."
 One of the stories in the 1998 Star Trek collection Star Trek: Strange New Worlds, was named "Of Cabbages And Kings", a line taken from the poem.

Live performance
 In the play Journey's End by R. C. Sheriff, the character Osborne quotes the poem to Raleigh before going to the trenches.

See also
 "I Am the Walrus"

References

External links

 Text of "The Walrus and the Carpenter" (with illustrations)
 Audio – hear the poem
 
 

1871 poems
1951 songs
Poetry by Lewis Carroll
Fictional pinnipeds
Fictional carpenters
Narrative poems
Songs from Alice in Wonderland
Songs about mammals